Jack Reacher is a 2012 American action thriller film written and directed by Christopher McQuarrie, starring Tom Cruise and based on Lee Child's 2005 novel One Shot.  Cruise portrays the title character and the supporting cast features Rosamund Pike, Werner Herzog, Robert Duvall, David Oyelowo, Richard Jenkins and Jai Courtney. The film entered production in October 2011, and was completed in January 2012. It was filmed entirely on location in Pittsburgh, Pennsylvania. The musical score was composed by Joe Kraemer, performed by the Hollywood Studio Symphony and recorded at the Sony Scoring Stage in Culver City, California. 

Cruise performed all of his own driving stunts during the film's car chase sequence. The film's premiere screening in Pittsburgh was postponed after the Sandy Hook Elementary School shooting; the movie was released in North America one week later on December 21,  2012, where it received generally positive reviews and was successful at the box office. A sequel was developed with Cruise titled Jack Reacher: Never Go Back, based on the 2013 novel Never Go Back, which was released on October 21, 2016.

Plot
In Pittsburgh, a man drives a van into a parking garage across the Allegheny River from PNC Park, dropping a quarter into the meter.  Using a rifle, he shoots and kills five people on the river's North Shore Trail from long range before driving off. The Pittsburgh Police, headed by Detective Calvin Emerson, find a shell casing and the quarter used to pay for parking. A fingerprint on the coin belongs to James Barr, an ex-United States Army sniper. When the police raid his house, they find the van, the rifle, and Barr unconscious. During an interrogation by Emerson and District Attorney Alex Rodin, Barr is offered a choice between life in prison in exchange for a full confession or a guaranteed death sentence, as Rodin has never lost a case. 

Barr instead  writes "Get Jack Reacher" on a notepad. Jack Reacher is a drifter and ex-US Army Military Police Corps investigator and major. He arrives in Pittsburgh after seeing a news broadcast about Barr. Emerson and Rodin deny Jack's request to view the evidence, but agree to let him see Barr, who was attacked by fellow inmates and is now in a coma. Jack meets Barr's defense attorney, Helen Rodin, Alex Rodin's daughter. Helen tells Jack he can see the evidence if he will be her investigator, but Jack retorts that he is not interested in clearing Barr. He reveals that Barr had gone on a killing spree during his tour of duty in Iraq, but was not prosecuted because, unbeknownst to Barr, his military contractor victims had just emerged from a weekend of assaulting numerous women, and the US Army just wanted the whole mess forgotten. 

Jack vowed that if Barr tried anything like that again, he would take him down. Jack agrees to investigate if Helen visits the victims' families to learn about the people murdered that day. Jack goes to the crime scene and finds inconsistencies; a trained sniper would have shot from a van on the nearby Fort Duquesne Bridge. An apparently random bar fight makes Jack realize that someone is attempting to strong-arm him into dropping his investigation. After Helen reports her findings about the victims to Jack, he suggests that the owner of local construction company Oline Archer was the real target, while the other victims served as a cover-up. Jack is later framed for the murder of the young woman who was paid to instigate the brawl. 

Jack eventually follows up a hunch to a shooting range in neighboring Ohio owned by ex-United States Marine Corps Gunnery Sergeant Martin Cash. The real perpetrators are working for a ruthless construction firm led by an ex-Soviet prisoner known only as Zek Chelovek ("prisoner human being"). The gang kidnaps Helen with the aid of Detective Emerson and holds her hostage at a quarry. Jack kills the henchmen and Emerson with Cash's help, before confronting the Zek. The Zek points out that Jack has killed all who could have testified against him and doubts that he will be convicted, while also stating that an American prison would be easy compared to his previous incarceration in Siberia. 

Convinced, Jack shoots him in the head. When Barr awakens from his coma, he tells Helen that he has no memory of the crime, but believes that he must be guilty. Barr's mental reconstruction of how he would have committed the shootings matches Jack's theory. A remorseful Barr is willing to accept both responsibility and punishment. However, Helen is confident he will be cleared. Meanwhile, Jack, sitting on a bus, overhears a man verbally and physically abusing a young woman and gets up to confront him.

Cast

Production

Development
Attempts to adapt author Lee Child's Jack Reacher novel series into a film have been made ever since the character debuted in 1997's Killing Floor. After being optioned with no success to PolyGram and later New Line Cinema, Paramount Pictures and Cruise/Wagner Productions acquired the film rights in 2005. Screenwriter Josh Olson was then hired to adapt Child's then-most recent novel in the Reacher series, One Shot (2005). In July 2010, Christopher McQuarrie, who previously collaborated with Cruise/Wagner Productions on the 2008 film Valkyrie, signed on to rework Olson's script and ultimately direct the film.

Casting
In June 2011, Tom Cruise was in talks for playing the role of Jack Reacher. The following month, Cruise closed a deal with the studios and signed on for the part. Some fans of the novel series became vocal over the casting of Cruise due to the actor's height (5'7") not matching the height of Reacher in the novels (6'5"). Explaining the casting decision, author Lee Child said that it would be impossible to find a suitable actor to play the giant Reacher and to recreate the feel of the book onscreen, and that Cruise had the talent to make an effective Reacher. Child also said, "Reacher's size in the books is a metaphor for an unstoppable force, which Cruise portrays in his own way." Of Cruise's relatively small stature, Child said, "With another actor you might get 100% of the height but only 90% of Reacher. With Tom, you'll get 100% of Reacher with 90% of the height."

Following the casting of Cruise, Rosamund Pike was cast as the female lead. Other actresses who were in the running for the role included Hayley Atwell and Alexa Davalos. By September 2011, the main cast was locked in with the hiring of David Oyelowo, Richard Jenkins, Jai Courtney, and Robert Duvall. Werner Herzog, primarily known for his directorial work, rounded out the cast in October 2011 when he signed on to play the film's chief villain.

In April 2017, Dwayne Johnson revealed that he was in the running to play Jack Reacher before Cruise was hired.

In a 2018 interview, two years after the 2016 release of the sequel, Child agreed that the readers were correct in their criticism, stating:
I really enjoyed working with Cruise. He's a really, really nice guy. We had a lot of fun. But ultimately the readers are right. The size of Reacher is really, really important and it's a big component of who he is...So what I've decided to do is – there won't be any more movies with Tom Cruise. Instead we're going to take it to Netflix or something like that. Long-form streaming television, with a completely new actor. We're rebooting and starting over and we're going to try and find the perfect guy.

Filming
Production on the film began in October 2011 and was completed in January 2012. Cruise performed all of his own driving stunts during the film's signature car chase sequence. "Action to me is something very fun to shoot. The challenge in most car chases is you're trying to hide the fact that it's not the actor driving," McQuarrie said. "The challenge here was the exact opposite. We were trying to find a way to show that it was always Tom driving. He's literally driving in every stunt sequence."

In February 2012, Kevin Messick, one of the film's executive producers, sued Don Granger and Gary Levinsohn, two other producers, for breach of contract over a joint venture agreement, claiming he had "helped to develop the film, renew Paramount's options for the rights to the book, and participated in the search for a screenwriter" but starting in July 2010, had been left out of meetings with the screenwriter and the studio and not given certain drafts of the screenplay while it was under development. Messick is suing for "unspecified damages, his producer's fees and the right to participate in any upcoming sequels."

Music
The film's musical score was composed by Joe Kraemer, who previously scored director McQuarrie's The Way of the Gun (2000). Kraemer was announced as the composer for the film in July 2012, having already started work on it. After spending eight weeks working with McQuarrie on materials to present to producers, Kraemer's hiring was approved and he directly began working on the film's opening eight minutes. "I have a number of tricks that I use to spark the wild creative process," said Kraemer on his scoring process after having seen the film. "Sometimes I'll use my mathematical understanding of music to devise a theme (such as the open fifths of Reacher's theme), sometimes I'll have an orchestral color in mind (i.e. the music for THE ZEC). The actual composing process probably resembles Max Steiner more than anyone else I know of. I start at the first frame of the movie and work my through to the end, chronologically, in order."

The film is noted for its balance between music and silence, with music primarily absent or reserved during a majority of the film's action sequences. Discussing his approach to this balance, Kraemer described, "Music can make such an impact when it enters a scene, and obviously the only way to do that is to have silence beforehand. I also generally like to have long tails on my cues so that they sort of fade away rather than ending abruptly. In this way, I try to weave music in and out very carefully so that the audience is as unaware as possible of the entrances and exits. I often cite Patton as a prime example of great spotting – a three and half hour biopic with, what, twenty-eight minutes of score? That's unheard of today. But it worked!"

The score was performed by the Hollywood Studio Symphony and recorded at the Sony Scoring Stage in Culver City, California. A soundtrack album for the film was released on December 18, 2012 by La-La Land Records.

Track listing

Distribution

Marketing
The trailer for Jack Reacher was officially released on Cruise's birthday, 2012.

Theatrical release
Jack Reacher, then titled One Shot, was originally slated to be released in February 2013. In March 2012, the release date was brought forward by Paramount Pictures to December 21, 2012, hoping to capitalize on the box office success of Cruise's Mission: Impossible – Ghost Protocol, which was released at a similar point in 2011. The film's new release date pushed the release of World War Z back six months.

The film was released in North American markets on December 21, 2012, with a premiere initially planned for Pittsburgh's SouthSide Works megaplex on December 15, 2012, which was to be attended by the film's stars, and Lee Child.<ref>Vancheri, Barbara, "Tom Cruise returning for 'Jack Reacher' premiere: Movie filmed in city; mid-December event first here in decades", Pittsburgh Post-Gazette, November 25, 2012</ref>

On December 15, 2012, Paramount Pictures announced it was indefinitely postponing the film's premiere screening in Pittsburgh, Pennsylvania, out of respect for the families of the victims of the Sandy Hook Elementary School shooting, which had occurred the day before. The opening scene shows a sniper shooting at people including a woman holding a small girl, and one point aiming the cross-hairs directly at her. Writer-director McQuarrie endorsed the decision, saying he and Cruise insisted upon it:Nobody should be celebrating anything 24 hours after a tragic event like that. We thought long and hard about it. This was not a snap judgment, because we wanted to give back to the city of Pittsburgh [by having the premiere there], because they were so great to us.

The film held its United Kingdom premiere on December 10, 2012 at London's Odeon Leicester Square. It was released in the U.K. on December 26, 2012.

Home mediaJack Reacher was released onto Blu-ray and DVD formats in the United Kingdom And in North American territories on March 19, 2013 by Paramount Home Media Distribution. The Blu-ray release contains two commentary tracks and three behind-the-scenes featurettes.  Jack Reacher received a 4K UHD Blu-Ray release on June 26, 2018.

Reception
Box officeJack Reacher grossed $80.1 million in North America and $138.3 million in other countries for a worldwide total of $218.3 million, against a budget of $60 million.

In North America, the film opened in 3,352 cinemas. Jack Reacher went on to gross $5.1 million on its opening day in the U.S. and Canada, and $15.6 million in its opening weekend. The film held well in its second weekend, dropping only 10.2% to a total of $14.1 million and ranking at  5.

Upon its opening five-day international start, making $5.5 million in the UK and $4.4 million in France, the film grossed a total of $18.1 million from 32 international markets. Throughout the following weeks, the film expanded to additional international markets and grossed an international total of $136,497,530.

Critical response
On Rotten Tomatoes the film has an approval rating of 63%, based on 185 reviews, with a rating average of 6.27/10. The website's critical consensus states, "Jack Reacher is an above-average crime thriller with a smoothly charismatic performance from Tom Cruise." On Metacritic the film has a weighted score of 50 out of 100, based on reviews from 36 critics, indicating "mixed or average reviews". CinemaScore polls reported that the average grade filmgoers gave the film was an "A−" on an A+ to F scale.

Todd McCarthy of The Hollywood Reporter wrote: "Tom Cruise is in fine form as mysterious tough guy Jack Reacher finally reaches the big screen." Peter Travers of Rolling Stone wrote: "This is Cruise's show. And he nails it. The patented smile is gone, replaced by a glower that makes Jack Reacher a dark and dazzling ride into a new kind of hell."

Many of the negative reviews still referred to the film as entertaining, including The Guardian, which called it "outrageous but entertaining". 
Peter Debruge of Variety was critical of the casting of Cruise as Reacher: "Reacher is a brawny action figure whose exploits would have been a good fit for the likes of Arnold Schwarzenegger or Sylvester Stallone back in the day, but feel less fun when delegated to a leading man like Tom Cruise. The star is too charismatic to play someone so cold-blooded, and his fans likely won't appreciate the stretch."
Lisa Schwarzbaum of Entertainment Weekly wrote: "That Cruise fails to make a case for Reacher's allure, though, has less to do with physical dissonance than it does with the film's inability - stupefying inability, really - to otherwise make a case for the character's originality in a movie so choked with visual clichés and dreadfully moldy dialogue."

Sequel

While Jack Reacher was intended to be a tent-pole for a film series, it was initially reported that a sequel would be unlikely due to its lackluster run at the North American box office. However, in February 2013, the possibility of a sequel became more likely after the film surpassed a gross of $200 million worldwide. On December 9, 2013, it was announced that Paramount Pictures and Skydance Productions were moving forward with the development of a sequel, reportedly based on the 2013 Jack Reacher novel Never Go Back.

Principal photography on the sequel, Jack Reacher: Never Go Back, began on October 20, 2015, in New Orleans. The sequel was directed by Edward Zwick, produced by Tom Cruise, Don Granger, and Christopher McQuarrie and was written by Zwick, Richard Wenk, and Marshall Herskovitz. It stars Tom Cruise, Cobie Smulders, Patrick Heusinger, Aldis Hodge, Danika Yarosh, and Holt McCallany. The plot follows Reacher going on-the-run with an army major who has been framed for espionage, and it reveals a dark conspiracy. Jack Reacher: Never Go Back'' was released on October 21, 2016, in IMAX and conventional formats. It grossed $161 million worldwide and received mixed reviews from critics.

References

External links
 
 
 
 
 

2012 films
2012 action thriller films
2012 crime thriller films
American action thriller films 
American crime thriller films
American detective films 
American martial arts films
Films about snipers
Films based on British novels
Films based on thriller novels
Films directed by Christopher McQuarrie
Films set in 2012
Films set in Pittsburgh
Films shot in Pittsburgh
Films with screenplays by Christopher McQuarrie
Paramount Pictures films
Skydance Media films
Films produced by Tom Cruise
Films scored by Joe Kraemer
Jack Reacher
2010s English-language films
2010s American films